Hwang Sun-hong (born 14 July 1968) is a South Korean former football player and current head coach of the South Korea national under-23 football team. He was the most notable South Korean striker in the 1990s and early 2000s.

Club career 
After graduating from Konkuk University, Hwang decided not to enter the K League and left for Germany to begin his professional career. During a season, he played for the reserve team of Bayer Leverkusen, scoring 16 goals in the Oberliga Nordrhein, Germany's third division at the time.

Next season, Hwang joined 2. Bundesliga side Wuppertaler SV, but he appeared only nine games due to a cruciate ligament injury.

Hwang joined POSCO Atoms (currently Pohang Steelers) after returning to South Korea in June 1993. He won two Asian Club Championships with Pohang, although he failed to win the K League title. He also scored in eight consecutive matches in 1995, setting a record in the K League.

Hwang spent much of his career in the J1 League and enjoyed his most prolific season with Cerezo Osaka. In the 1999 J1 League, he scored 24 goals during 25 appearances, becoming the top goalscorer. He is the first South Korean footballer to become the top scorer in a foreign league. He was also nominated for the Asian Footballer of the Year award in that year. In late 2003, having finally retired, Hwang has now turned his attention to coaching.

International career

1990 World Cup 
An unknown college player, Hwang was suddenly selected for the South Korea national football team for the 1988 AFC Asian Cup by the manager Lee Hoe-taik. He scored his first and second goal against Japan and Iran respectively in the tournament.

Hwang was included in the national team for the 1990 FIFA World Cup after his outstanding performances including seven goals in qualifying campaign. In the competition, however, he had difficulty in showing teamwork, and couldn't prevent South Korea's three defeats.

1994 World Cup 
Hwang showed poor performance by scoring only one goal in qualifiers of the 1994 FIFA World Cup, but his form was regained in the friendly matches just before the World Cup. However, his left knee was injured in the last friendly against Honduras before the tournament, worrying his manager Kim Ho. In the first game against Spain, he had two chances to score, but missed both. He apologized to his teammates after the first game, but his poor performance was continued by missing several opportunities against Bolivia. He scored a goal in the last group game against the defending champions Germany, but the game ended in a 3–2 defeat. He was severely blamed for his inexact shots against Bolivia by South Korean fans, and suffered from social anxiety disorder after South Korea was eliminated in the group stage.

1996 Summer Olympics 
In contrast with fans' criticism, Hwang was consistently chosen as a striker of the national team by managers. In the 1994 Asian Games, he scored eleven goals in five games, becoming the top goalscorer of the tournament.

Hwang also played for the South Korean under-23 team as an over-aged player in the 1996 Summer Olympics. He contributed to a victory by winning a crucial penalty in the first game against Ghana, but he quit the tournament due to his injury during the first half of the second game.

Hwang looked forward to the 1998 FIFA World Cup to make up for his failure in the 1994 World Cup, but he was injured by a Chinese goalkeeper Jiang Jin in a friendly just before the World Cup. He was disappointed to be excluded from the line-up during the tournament.

2002 World Cup 
In the 2001 FIFA Confederations Cup, Hwang won the Bronze Shoe award after scoring in two victories against Mexico and Australia.

Hwang was still an important part of South Korea even at the 2002 FIFA World Cup, although he approached his mid-30s. He scored the winning goal in the first match against Poland, helping South Korea to achieve their first-ever victory in the FIFA World Cup. In the second match against the United States, his head was injured, but he won a penalty after wrapping a bandage around his head. In the penalty shoot-out of the quarter-final match against Spain, he came forward as South Korea's first kicker, and succeeded in scoring.

Hwang made 103 appearances and 50 goals for South Korea alongside six operations due to injuries. He ended his international career after the 2002 World Cup.

Managerial career 
In 2005, Hwang was appointed as assistant coach of Jeonnam Dragons and started his coaching career. He received Best Coach Award from the 2006 Korean FA Cup. On 4 December 2007, he signed a three-year contract with Busan IPark and became manager of Busan.

On 9 November 2010, he returned to his former team Pohang Steelers as manager. In first coaching year at the Pohang, he guided the team to the second place in the regular season. A sound knowledge of coaching, player training, and club training analysis and observation - as a coach, the Pohang Steelers became the FA Cup champions in 2012. The success of the organization under the careful, meticulous, and successful guidance of Hwang continued as the Pohang defended their FA Cup title for another year in 2013 and became K League 1 champions in that year. He received the K League Manager of the Year Award.

On 21 June 2016, he was appointed as manager of FC Seoul. On 30 April 2018, he resigned as Seoul manager with responsibility for poor performance. On 14 December 2018, Hwang was appointed as manager of Yanbian Funde. However, he left the club after Yanbian Funde was disqualified for the 2019 China League One due to owing taxes in February 2019.

Career statistics

Club

International

Results list South Korea's goal tally first.

Honours

Player
Pohang Steelers
Korean FA Cup: 1996
Korean League Cup: 1993
Asian Club Championship: 1996–97, 1997–98

South Korea
FIFA World Cup fourth place: 2002
AFC Asian Cup runner-up: 1988
Asian Games bronze medal: 1990
Dynasty Cup: 1990

Individual
Korean FA Best XI: 1988
Asian Games top goalscorer: 1994
K League 1 Best XI: 1995
J1 League top goalscorer: 1999
J.League Best XI: 1999
FIFA Confederations Cup Bronze Shoe: 2001
K League 30th Anniversary Best XI: 2013

Manager
Busan IPark
Korean FA Cup runner-up: 2010
Korean League Cup runner-up: 2009

Pohang Steelers
K League 1: 2013
Korean FA Cup: 2012, 2013

FC Seoul
K League 1: 2016
Korean FA Cup runner-up: 2016

Individual
Korean FA Cup Best Manager: 2012
K League 1 Manager of the Year: 2013, 2016

See also
 List of men's footballers with 100 or more international caps
 List of men's footballers with 50 or more international goals

References

External links 
 
 Hwang Sun-hong – National Team Stats at KFA 
 
 

 International Appearances & Goals

1968 births
Living people
People from Yesan County
Association football forwards
South Korean footballers
South Korean expatriate footballers
South Korea international footballers
South Korean football managers
Wuppertaler SV players
2. Bundesliga players
Pohang Steelers players
J1 League players
Cerezo Osaka players
Suwon Samsung Bluewings players
Kashiwa Reysol players
Jeonnam Dragons players
Busan IPark managers
Pohang Steelers managers
FC Seoul managers
K League 1 managers
Expatriate footballers in Germany
Expatriate footballers in Japan
1988 AFC Asian Cup players
1990 FIFA World Cup players
1994 FIFA World Cup players
1998 FIFA World Cup players
2000 CONCACAF Gold Cup players
2001 FIFA Confederations Cup players
2002 CONCACAF Gold Cup players
2002 FIFA World Cup players
Footballers at the 1996 Summer Olympics
Olympic footballers of South Korea
FIFA Century Club
South Korean expatriate sportspeople in Germany
South Korean expatriate sportspeople in Japan
Konkuk University alumni
Asian Games medalists in football
Footballers at the 1990 Asian Games
Footballers at the 1994 Asian Games
Asian Games bronze medalists for South Korea
Medalists at the 1990 Asian Games
Pyeonghae Hwang clan
Yanbian Funde F.C. managers
Expatriate football managers in China
Daejeon Hana Citizen FC managers
Sportspeople from South Chungcheong Province